Stelian Isac (born 19 September 1981) is a Romanian former association football defender, currently a fitness coach.

Honours
Victoria Brănești
Liga II: 2009–10
Liga III: 2008–09

References

External links
 
 

1981 births
Living people
People from Panciu
Romanian footballers
Association football defenders
Liga I players
Liga II players
FCM Bacău players
CS Brănești players
ACF Gloria Bistrița players
FC Voluntari players